Rejected Addresses was the title of an 1812 book of parodies by the brothers James and Horace Smith. In the line of 18th-century pastiches focussed on a single subject in the style of poets of the time, it contained twenty-one good-natured pastiches of contemporary authors. The book's popular success set the fashion for a number of later works of the same kind.

Precursors
Although parody is a long-standing literary genre, the mock heroic of Augustan times began to share its territory with parody, using the deflationary inversion of values - comparing small things with great - as a satirical tool in the deconstruction of the epic style. A later humorous tactic, in place of a connected narrative in the mock-epic manner, was to apply poems in the style of varied authors to a single deflationary subject. The ultimate forerunner of this approach has been identified with Isaac Brown's small work, A Pipe of Tobacco, in Imitation of Six Several Authors, first published in 1736. In that case the poets Colley Cibber, Ambrose Philips, James Thomson, Edward Young, Alexander Pope and Jonathan Swift were used as the focus for its series of good-natured parodic variations. The popularity of these was attested by many subsequent editions and by their reproduction in the poetical miscellanies of after decades.

A new direction was given to this departure by employing parody as a weapon in the political conflicts of the 1790s. This was particularly identified with the Anti-Jacobin, where the works of poets identified with liberal tendencies were treated with satirical humour. An anthology of such parodies, The Poetry of the Anti-Jacobin, followed in 1800 and its popularity guaranteed frequent editions over the following decades. Although the name of their targets are generally not mentioned, a clue is usually given by way of preface or notes, sometimes quoting the opening lines. Robert Southey was a particular victim in early numbers of the weekly, in which his lofty sentiments were downgraded to ridiculous bathos.  For his "Inscription for the apartment in Chepstow Castle, where Henry Martin the regicide was imprisoned thirty years" was substituted the Newgate Prison cell of a drunken "Elizabeth Brownrigg the Prentice-cide" (I). And Southey's humanitarian themes clothed in experimental metres were rewritten as "The friend of humanity and the knife-grinder" (II) and the subversive "The Soldier’s Friend" (V).

Later numbers took as their target speculative philosophical and scientific works aiming at popular acceptance by being clothed in verse. Richard Payne Knight’s The Progress of Civil Society (1796) became the satirical "The Progress of Man" (XV, XVI, XXI). This was later ascribed to the fictitious "Mr Higgins of St Mary Axe", author as well of "The Loves of the Triangles" (XXIII, XXIV, XXVI, a parody of Erasmus Darwin’s verse treatise The Loves of the Plants (1791) mingled with gallophile propaganda. He also reappears as author of "The Rovers" (XXX – XXXI), an imitation seemingly based on contemporary translations of popular German melodramas.

Rejected Addresses
The widened parodic focus from poetry to drama in the Anti-Jacobin was taken even further in the Rejected Addresses of 1812, in which works in prose were made additional targets. The occasion given for its publication was a public competition advertised in the press for an address to be spoken at the reopening of the Drury Lane Theatre, which had been destroyed by fire. As none of the actual entries were considered adequate in the end, Lord Byron was commissioned to write one specially. But when the brothers James and Horace Smith heard of the result of the competition, they planned a volume of parodies of writers of the day, to be published as supposed failed entries and issued to coincide with the theatre’s opening.

Titled Rejected Addresses: Or, The New Theatrum Poetarum, the book’s contents were as follows:

References

1812 books
British books
Parodies of literature